The 2011–12 Eurocup Basketball season was the tenth edition of Europe's second-tier level transnational competition for men's professional basketball clubs, the EuroCup. The EuroCup is the European-wide league level that is one level below the EuroLeague. It ran from September 27, 2011, until April 15, 2012. The winner of this competition earned a place at the group stage of the next season's EuroLeague.

Teams allocation

Distribution

32 teams participated in the Eurocup Regular Season:

 A total of 10 teams from nine countries qualified directly to the 32-team regular season through their results in domestic competitions, or through a wild card.
 Another 8 teams earned their place at the group stage by winning a qualifying round. On July 7, a draw for the Eurocup Qualifying Round, which featured 16 teams from 13 countries, was held in Barcelona. The 8 winners from those two-game, head-to-head qualifying games advanced to the Eurocup Regular Season.
 The remaining 14 teams were filled with the losers of the Euroleague qualifying rounds that was played from 29 September - 2 October.

Teams
The labels in the parentheses show how each team qualified for the place of its starting round (TH: EuroCup title holders; FEC: FBIA EuroChallenge title holders):
1st, 2nd, 3rd, 4th, 5th, etc.: League position after eventual Playoffs
RW: Regular season winners
CW: Cup winners
EL: EuroLeague
EL QR: EuroLeague qualifying round losers

Qualifying round

The eight winners of the qualifying round joined the regular season. The eight losers transferred to the EuroChallenge regular season.

Regular season
The Regular Season ran from November 15, 2011, to December 20, 2011.

If teams were level on record at the end of the Regular Season, tiebreakers were applied in the following order:
 Head-to-head record.
 Head-to-head point differential.
 Point differential during the Regular Season.
 Points scored during the regular season.
 Sum of quotients of points scored and points allowed in each Regular Season match.

Group A

Group B

Group C

Group D

Group E

Group F

Group G

Group H

Last 16

Group I

Group J

Group K

Group L

Quarterfinals

The quarterfinals were two-legged ties determined on aggregate score. The first legs were played on March 20. The return legs were played on March 27. The group winners in each tie, listed as Team 1, hosted the second leg.

Final four

Euroleague Basketball Company announced that the 2011–12 Eurocup season would culminate with the Eurocup Finals in Khimki, Russia, on April 14 and 15.

Individual statistics

Rating

Points

Rebounds

Assists

Awards

MVP Weekly

Regular season

Top 16

Quarterfinals

Eurocup MVP
  Patrick Beverley (Spartak St. Petersburg)

Eurocup Finals MVP
  Zoran Planinić (Khimki)

All-Eurocup Team

Coach of the Year
 Jure Zdovc (Spartak St. Petersburg)

Rising Star
 Jonas Valančiūnas (Lietuvos Rytas)

See also
 2011–12 Euroleague Basketball
 2011–12 EuroChallenge

References

Seeding and draw procedure

External links

 
Euro
2011-12